The National Institute of Statistics (officially in  (INS); or in ) is Tunisia's statistics agency. Its head office is in Tunis.

References

External links
 Institute of Statistics (Direct frame)

Tunisia
Government of Tunisia